South Fillmore Township was a civil township of Montgomery County, Illinois, United States. It consisted of the northern two-thirds of survey Township 7 North, Range 2 West of the Third Principal Meridian.

History
It was split from Fillmore Township in 1921, and annexed back into Fillmore Township in May 2017.

In November 2016, voters passed a referendum to consolidate South Fillmore Township into Fillmore Township as of the May 2017 township elections.

Adjacent townships
 Fillmore Township (north)
 Shafter Township, Fayette County (east)
 Mulberry Grove Township, Bond County (south)
 Lagrange Township, Bond County (southwest)
 East Fork Township (west & northwest)

References

External links
City-data.com
Illinois State Archives
Historical Society of Montgomery County

1921 establishments in Illinois
2017 disestablishments in Illinois
Former townships in Illinois
Former populated places in Illinois
Townships in Montgomery County, Illinois
Populated places disestablished in 2017